Pteroteinon iricolor, the green-winged red-eye, is a butterfly in the family Hesperiidae. It is found in Sierra Leone, Liberia, Ivory Coast, Ghana, Nigeria, Cameroon, Gabon, the Republic of the Congo and the central part of the Democratic Republic of the Congo. The habitat mostly consists of wet forests.

Adults have been recorded feeding on the flowers of Mussaenda species.

References

Butterflies described in 1890
Erionotini
Butterflies of Africa